Kelly Mitchell (born 1966/1967) is an American politician and businesswoman who served as the 54th Indiana State Treasurer. She was elected treasurer on November 4, 2014 and assumed office early on November 18, 2014. She replaced interim Treasurer, Daniel Huge, who took over after Richard Mourdock resigned. Mitchell was an at-large delegate to the 2016 Republican National Convention from Indiana. She was a candidate in the 2020 Republican primary in Indiana's 5th congressional district. Mitchell received 5.3% of the vote in the 2020 Republican primary. In late 2021, Mitchell and several staff members were included in a lawsuit alleging a mishandling of state contracts via a whistleblower.

Early life and education
Born in Newport, Rhode Island, Mitchell earned a Bachelor of Arts degree in political science from Valparaiso University and a Master of Arts in philanthropic studies from Indiana University – Purdue University Indianapolis. Mitchell completed The Commandant's National Security Seminar and earned a Master of Arts in strategic studies from the United States Army War College.

Career
Before becoming Treasurer of Indiana, Mitchell served as director of TrustINdiana from November 2007 to August 2014. Her office was part of the State Treasurer's office. Before becoming Director of TrustINdiana, She served as Cass County Commissioner from January 1997 to September 2004. During her tenure as Commissioner, she served as President of the Board of Commissioners for five years and was named First-Term Commissioner of the Year by the Association of County Commissioners. Treasurer Mitchell also served on the State Board of the Association of County Commissioners for three years, and as a member of the County Government Senate Study Commission. As Commissioner, she served seven years on the Logansport-Cass County Economic Development Foundation and as President of the Foundation for one year. She founded and co-chaired Cass County "Make a Difference Day", managing hundreds of volunteers and dozens of projects every year.

Indiana State Treasurer
Mitchell filed her candidacy for State Treasurer in 2013. Two other candidates vied for the position. Financial advisor and candidate for the U.S. Senate in 2010 and for Indiana's 6th congressional district in 2012 Don Bates and Marion Mayor and candidate for Indiana's 5th congressional district in 2012 Wayne Seybold. In the Republican primary convention, the first ballot was a "relative toss-up" and although no candidate won a majority on the second ballot, Mitchell gained votes. Bates, who was in third place, was dropped after the second ballot. Mitchell won the third ballot, by 860 votes to 497. She defeated her Democratic opponent, former member of the Illinois House of Representatives and candidate for Lieutenant Governor of Illinois in 2010 Mike Boland on November 4, 2014.

In July 2017, Mitchell announced the launch of INvestABLE Indiana which is a savings program for disabled Hoosiers. Prior to this, people with disabilities who saved more than $2,000 could lose government benefits. Now, they can use the plan to save $14,000 a year, and keep $100,000 in the account. In order to qualify, a person must have the onset of disability before the age of 26. They must also be receiving Social Security benefits.

On September 4, 2019, Mitchell officially entered the race for the Republican nomination for Indiana's 5th congressional district to replace retiring Congresswoman Susan Brooks. She received 5.3% of the vote in the primary.

Personal life
Mitchell resides in Indianapolis, with her husband Larry, and they have a blended family of four children.

References

|-

1960s births
21st-century American politicians
21st-century American women politicians
Living people
County commissioners in Indiana
Indiana Republicans
Indiana University–Purdue University Indianapolis alumni
People from Logansport, Indiana
State treasurers of Indiana
Valparaiso University alumni
Women in Indiana politics